Buyanjav Batzorig (born March 9, 1983) is a former Olympian freestyle wrestler and a Mongolian national wrestling team coach. Since January 2017, he has been working as coach. As a wrestler he participated in Men's freestyle 66 kg at 2008 Summer Olympics. In the 1/16 of final he beat Heinrich Barnes, but in the 1/8 of final he was eliminated by Irbek Farniev from Russia.

Batzorig won a gold medal during the 2006 Asian Games. Also, Batzorig won a gold medal during the 2006 World University Championships.

External links
 
 Wrestler bio on beijing2008.com

Living people
1983 births
Olympic wrestlers of Mongolia
Wrestlers at the 2008 Summer Olympics
Asian Games medalists in wrestling
Wrestlers at the 2006 Asian Games
Mongolian male sport wrestlers
Asian Games bronze medalists for Mongolia
Medalists at the 2006 Asian Games
Asian Wrestling Championships medalists
20th-century Mongolian people
21st-century Mongolian people